The Munda peoples of eastern and central parts of the Indian subcontinent are any of several  tribal groups who natively speak Munda languages of Austro-asiatic language family, formerly also known as Kolarian, and spoken by about nine million people.

History
According to linguist Paul Sidwell, Munda languages arrived on the coast of Odisha from Southeast Asia about 4000-3500 years ago. The Munda people spread from Southeast Asia and mixed extensively with local Indian populations. Robert Parkin notes that the term "Munda" did not belong to the Austroasiatic lexis and is of Sanskrit origin.

Austroasiatic DNA 
Mitsuru Sakitani suggests that Haplogroup O1b1, which is common in Austroasiatic people and some other ethnic groups in southern China, and haplogroup O1b2, which is common in today Japanese, Koreans and some Manchu, are the carriers of Yangtze civilization (Baiyue). Another study suggests that the haplogroup O1b1 is the major Austroasiatic paternal lineage and O1b2 the “para-Austroasiatic” lineage of the Yayoi people.

Migration into India 
According to Chaubey et al., "Austro-Asiatic speakers in India today are derived from dispersal from Southeast Asia, followed by extensive sex-specific admixture with local Indian populations." According to Riccio et al., the Munda people are likely descended from Austroasiatic migrants from Southeast Asia.

According to Zhang et al., Austroasiatic migrations from Southeast Asia into India took place after the last Glacial maximum, circa 10,000 years ago. Arunkumar et al. suggest Austroasiatic migrations from Southeast Asia occurred into Northeast India 5.2 ± 0.6 kya and into East India 4.3 ± 0.2 kya.

Tätte et al. 2019 estimated that the Austroasiatic language speaking people admixed with Indian population about 2000-3800 year ago which may suggest arrival of south-east Asian genetic component in the area. Munda-speaking people have high amount of East Asian paternal lineages O1b1 (~75%) and D1a1 (~6%), which is absent from other Indian groups. They found that the modern Munda-speaking people have about 29% East/Southeast Asian , 15.5% West Asian and 55.5% South Asian ancestry on average. The authors concluded that there was a mostly male-dominated migration into India from Southeast Asia. Modern people in Laos, Cambodia and Malaysia were found to represent the ancestral group, which migrated into India, and spread the Austroasiatic languages. Munda peoples are genetically closely related to Mah Meri and Temuan people of Malaysia.

Ethnic groups
 Asur people
 Bhumij people
 Birhor people
 Bonda people
 Didayi (Dire, Gta’) people
 Gadaba people (Only some Gadabas speak the Bonda-related Gutob language. Some others speak a Dravidian language.)
 Gorum (Parenga) people
 Ho people
 Juang people
 Kharia people
 Kodaku people
 Korku people
 Korwa people
 Munda people
 Sabar people
 Santhal people
 Sora people

Possible kins of the Munda peoples 
Some ethnic groups do not natively speak any of the Munda languages, but genetic evidence suggest gene flow of some Munda genetic lineages.
 Khonds
 Gonds
 Baiga
 Nihali
 Saharia

References

External links 
 http://projekt.ht.lu.se/rwaai RWAAI (Repository and Workspace for Austroasiatic Intangible Heritage)
 http://hdl.handle.net/10050/00-0000-0000-0003-66EE-3@view Munda languages in RWAAI Digital Archive
Scheduled Tribes of India
Social groups of Odisha
Social groups of Jharkhand